Pandurang Purushottam Shirodkar (12 December 1916 – 5 September 2000) was a campaigner, author and the first speaker of the Goa Legislative Assembly. He was born in Goa in Portuguese India. He studied law and worked as an editor of the Navshakti daily newspaper in Mumbai.

Later he participated actively in Goa's struggle for freedom from Portuguese colonial rule and was in exile in Africa and Portugal for many years. He was a member of the Indian National Congress and a prominent figure in the Maharashtrawadi Gomantak Party.

Shirodkar authored many books in Marathi, Konkani, English and Portuguese, and translated Bal Gangadhar Tilak's Shrimadbhagwadgeetarahasya into Portuguese.

See also
Goa Legislative Assembly

References

Speakers of the Goa Legislative Assembly
Indian National Congress politicians from Goa
Maharashtrawadi Gomantak Party politicians
Goa, Daman and Diu MLAs 1963–1967
Goa liberation activists
1916 births
2000 deaths